Khyri Jaquan Thomas (born May 8, 1996) is an American professional basketball player for CB San Pablo Burgos of the Liga Española de Baloncesto (LEB Oro). He played college basketball for the Creighton Bluejays. He was drafted 38th overall by the Philadelphia 76ers in the 2018 NBA draft and then traded to the Detroit Pistons.

Early life
Thomas attended Omaha Benson High School Magnet in Omaha, Nebraska. He committed to Creighton University to play college basketball. Prior to attending Creighton, he attended Fork Union Military Academy.

College career
As a freshman at Creighton, Thomas averaged 6.2 points, 1.4 assists and 3.7 rebounds per game. As a sophomore, he averaged 12.3 points, 3.3 assists and 5.8 rebounds and was named the Big East Defensive Player of the Year along with Josh Hart and Mikal Bridges. As a junior, he averaged 15.1 points, 2.8 assists and 4.4 rebounds and again was named the Big East Defensive Player of the Year. He entered the 2018 NBA draft without initially hiring an agent, but on May 13 announced he was staying in the draft and forfeiting his final season at Creighton.

Professional career

Detroit Pistons (2018–2020)
On June 21, 2018, Thomas was drafted 38th overall by the Philadelphia 76ers in the 2018 NBA draft. He was then traded to the Detroit Pistons in exchange for two future second-round draft picks. Thomas made his NBA debut on November 9, 2018 against the Atlanta Hawks, playing four minutes and making a three pointer.

On November 20, 2020, the Pistons traded Thomas to the Atlanta Hawks; he was waived shortly after.

Austin Spurs (2021)
On December 13, 2020, Thomas was reported to have had signed with and waived by the San Antonio Spurs. He was later included in roster of Austin Spurs where he appeared in seven games and averaged 13.9 points, 3.4 rebounds and 2.3 three-pointers made on 45.7% shooting, which was the fourth-highest three-point percentage of any player who averaged at least 2.0 three pointers with two or more games played.

Houston Rockets (2021)
On May 7, 2021, Thomas signed a 10-day contract with the Houston Rockets. In his first two days on this contract, he averaged 21.5 points on 57.1% shooting. On May 8, 2021, Thomas scored a career-high 27 points with five rebounds, five steals, three assists and two blocks in a 116–124 loss to the Utah Jazz. On May 14, he signed a multi-year contract with the Rockets. However, he was waived on October 6.

Bilbao Basket (2021–2022)
On November 24, 2021, Thomas signed with Bilbao Basket of the Liga ACB. He played only two games for the team.

Maccabi Tel Aviv (2022)
On January 10, 2022, Thomas signed with Maccabi Tel Aviv of the Israeli Basketball Premier League and the EuroLeague.

Tofaş (2022)
On July 15, 2022, he has signed with Tofaş of Basketbol Süper Ligi (BSL). In October 2022, after playing only two games with his new club, he decided to give a break to his professional career for personal reasons.

Career statistics

NBA

Regular season

|-
| style="text-align:left;"| 
| style="text-align:left;"| Detroit
| 26 || 0 || 7.5 || .319 || .286 || .636 || .8 || .3 || .3 || .2 || 2.3
|-
| style="text-align:left;"| 
| style="text-align:left;"| Detroit
| 8 || 0 || 7.6 || .294 || .357 || .500 || .1 || .4 || .4 || .0 || 2.1
|-
| style="text-align:left;"| 
| style="text-align:left;"| Houston
| 5 || 2 || 30.6 || .485 || .333 || 1.000 || 3.6 || 5.0 || 1.8 || 1.2 || 16.4
|- class="sortbottom"
| style="text-align:center;" colspan="2"| Career 
| 39 || 2 || 10.5 || .314 || .388 || .750 || 1.0 || .9 || .5 || .3 || 4.1

Playoffs

|-
| style="text-align:left;"| 
| style="text-align:left;"| Detroit
| 3 || 0 || 5.0 || .500 || .250 || 1.000 || .7 || .0 || .7 || .0 || 4.7
|- class="sortbottom"
| style="text-align:center;" colspan="2"| Career 
| 3 || 0 || 5.0 || .500 || .250 || 1.000 || .7 || .0 || .7 || .0 || 4.7

College

|-
| style="text-align:left;"| 2015–16
| style="text-align:left;"| Creighton
| 34 || 28 || 18.6 || .471 || .418 || .521 || 3.7 || 1.4 || 1.0 || .1 || 6.2
|-
| style="text-align:left;"| 2016–17
| style="text-align:left;"| Creighton
| 35 || 34 || 31.2 || .505 || .393 || .766 || 5.8 || 3.3 || 1.5 || .4 || 12.3
|-
| style="text-align:left;"| 2017–18
| style="text-align:left;"| Creighton
| 33 || 33 || 31.7 || .538 || .411 || .788 || 4.4 || 2.8 || 1.7 || .2 || 15.1
|- class="sortbottom"
| style="text-align:center;" colspan="2"| Career
| 102 || 95 || 27.2 || .511 || .406 || .719 || 4.6 || 2.5 || 1.4 || .3 || 11.2

References

External links
Creighton Bluejays bio

1996 births
Living people
21st-century African-American sportspeople
African-American basketball players
American men's basketball players
Austin Spurs players
Basketball players from Nebraska
Creighton Bluejays men's basketball players
Detroit Pistons players
Grand Rapids Drive players
Houston Rockets players
Maccabi Tel Aviv B.C. players
Philadelphia 76ers draft picks
Point guards
Sportspeople from Omaha, Nebraska
Tofaş S.K. players